The Kuroko mine is one of the largest lead and zinc mines in United States. The mine is located in Alaska. The mine has reserves amounting to 37 million tonnes of ore grading 0.8% lead, 5.5% zinc, 0.73 million oz of gold and 55.6 million oz of silver.

References 

Lead and zinc mines in the United States